The Ikarus Funflyer is a German high-wing, single-place, hang glider, designed by Thomas Pellicci and produced by his company Ikarus Drachen Thomas Pellicci.

Design and development
The Funflyer is intended to be a simple single surface glider with easy handling and modest performance for student use and flight training. It is particularly easy to take-off and land. Unlike many hang glider models, the Funflyer is available in just one size.

The aircraft is made from aluminum tubing, with the wing covered in Dacron sailcloth. Its  span wing is cable braced from a single kingpost. The glider achieves a glide ratio of 8:1. It is certified as DHV Class 1.

Specifications (Funflyer)

References

External links

Hang gliders